is a Prefectural Natural Park in central Miyazaki Prefecture, Japan. Established in 1958, the park is within the municipalities of Kawaminami, Kijō, and Tsuno. The area is celebrated for the  group of waterfalls - which have been designated a Place of Scenic Beauty.

See also
 National Parks of Japan

References

External links
  Map of Osuzu Prefectural Natural Park

Parks and gardens in Miyazaki Prefecture
Protected areas established in 1958
1958 establishments in Japan